Teresa Te Tamaki (born 31 December 1981) is a former New Zealand rugby union player.

Biography 
Te Tamaki became the Director of Lifestyle Physiotherapy in 2015. She represented New Zealand in 15s and sevens before retiring in 2016. Her cousins are New Zealand Sevens players Isaac and Terina Te Tamaki.

Te Tamaki made her Black Ferns debut against Australia in 2007 at Porirua. She represented the Black Ferns sevens at the 2009 Rugby World Cup Sevens in Dubai. She was named in the Black Ferns tour of England in 2011 and featured in all three games. Te Tamaki faced England again in 2012, she came off the bench in the 8–17 and 23–32 losses.

Te Tamaki made her last appearance for the Black Ferns at the 2015 Women's Rugby Super Series in Canada. The series would be her first international tests as a Hooker. She came off the bench in the 40–22 victory over hosts, Canada. Te Tamaki finally recorded a win against world champions England in the 26–7 win in Calgary. Then she helped defeat the United States 47–14 in her last appearance.

References

External links 

 Black Ferns Profile

1981 births
Living people
New Zealand female rugby union players
New Zealand women's international rugby union players
New Zealand female rugby sevens players
New Zealand women's international rugby sevens players